Downfield Football Club are a Scottish junior football club based in the Downfield area of Dundee. Their home ground is Downfield Park.

History 
The club's nickname, "The Spiders", comes from the same term applied to Queen's Park, due to Downfield playing in the same narrow black-and-white hooped strips as Scotland's oldest club. When Downfield were first founded, Queen's donated a set of strips to them to assist with the start-up.

Downfield Park is situated in the Kirkton area of Dundee. The far side has a covered enclosure named after Eric Clark, a long-serving committee member now deceased. The south side of the ground contains the club's Social Club, incorporating the changing facilities. The west end has recently seen a flattening of the earth banking at that end, with a view to eventual construction of new facilities. The ground also occasionally plays host to Tayside Police's football side. From 2017, Downfield have groundshared Downfield Park with Lochee Harp whilst their new ground went through development, and plan to leave in late 2020.

Up until the end of the 2005–06 season, they played in the Tayside Premier League of the Scottish Junior Football Association's Eastern Region. The SJFA restructured prior to the 2006–07 season, and Downfield found themselves in the twelve-team East Region, North Division. They finished third in their first season in the division.

Downfield became the East Region, North Division champions in 2010–11. In terms of all-time trophy records, Downfield are second only to Tayport in the Tayside / North District roll of honour. The Scottish Junior Cup, along with the more recently created East Region Cup and Tayside/Fife Cup are the only honours to elude the club. The Spiders side which won the Tayside League three times in a row at the end of the 1980s is generally considered to be the best footballing side in Tayside's recent history.

Due to the mass exodus of teams from the SJFA's East Region to the East of Scotland Football League after the 2017–18 season, Downfield were placed into the SJFA East Super League for the 2018–19 season, finishing 11th place that season. After further defections to the EoSFL causing the East Super League to be split into divisions, the Spiders managed to get up to 4th place in the Super League North in 2019–20 season, before it being abandoned due to the COVID-19 pandemic.

2021 takeover 
In 2021, the club announced a takeover from Peter and Paul Marr, with a new committee led by Danny Martin to lead the club forward. In April of that year, the club announced that Lewis Toshney would become manager.

Honours 
North-Tayside Inter Regional Cup: 1989–90, 1990–91

References

External links
 Google ground view

 
Football clubs in Scotland
Scottish Junior Football Association clubs
Football clubs in Dundee
Association football clubs established in 1912
1912 establishments in Scotland